Amphitheater Mountain is located in the Lewis Range, Glacier National Park in the U.S. state of Montana. Amphitheater Mountain is a descriptive name given to the peak because of its resemblance to the Greek Amphitheater. The mountain's Blackfoot name is Three Horns or Niuóxkai-ozkina for a Blackfoot warrior who captured a Nez Perce woman as was able to live happily ever after.  The mountain has also been named Whalen Mountain for a former park ranger.

See also
 List of mountains and mountain ranges of Glacier National Park (U.S.)

References

Mountains of Glacier County, Montana
Mountains of Glacier National Park (U.S.)
Lewis Range
Mountains of Montana